The United Kingdom's Institute of Heraldic and Genealogical Studies (IHGS) was founded in 1961 at Canterbury, Kent (its current location) by Cecil Humphery-Smith. Its library was created by donations from Humphery-Smith, Aylmer Buesst and others.

The Institute promotes research, study, and training in all aspects of family history, including heraldry. Courses may be undertaken by full-time students, through a series of evening classes combined with other studies, or by a correspondence course. Those who complete approved courses may sit the diploma examination after submitting adequate evidence of practical experience. Those who hold the diploma and produce an acceptable dissertation or thesis can qualify as Licentiates of the Institute, or LHG. Students, armorists, genealogists and family historians are able to make use of the extensive collection of books and manuscripts in the Institute's library.

In January 2010, Dr Richard C. F. Baker became Principal of the Institute.

Arms
In 1982, armorial bearings were granted to the Institute. These are blazoned Azure a Cross patonce within an orle of eight Acorns cups inward Or.

See also
Heraldry societies
The Heraldry Society
The College of Arms

References

External links
Institute Website

Heraldic societies